Transcription factor SOX-4 is a protein that in humans is encoded by the SOX4 gene.

Function 

This intronless gene encodes a member of the SOX (SRY-related HMG-box) family of transcription factors involved in the regulation of embryonic development and in the determination of the cell fate. The encoded protein may act as a transcriptional regulator after forming a protein complex with other proteins, such as syndecan binding protein (syntenin). The protein may function in the apoptosis pathway leading to cell death as well as to tumorigenesis and may mediate downstream effects of parathyroid hormone (PTH) and PTH-related protein (PTHrP) in bone development. The solution structure has been resolved for the HMG-box of a similar mouse protein.

Sox4 is expressed in lymphocytes (B and T) and is required for B lymphocyte development.

Clinical significance 

A genomic region close to the SOX4 gene has been associated with endometrial cancer development.

Interactions 
SOX4 has been shown to interact with SDCBP.

See also 
 SOX gene family

References

Further reading

External links 
 

Transcription factors